A canonical link is either

 a canonical link element, an HTML element that helps webmasters prevent duplicate content issues; or
 a function specified in a generalized linear model in statistics; see Generalized_linear_model#Link_function.